The 1949 Salad Bowl was a college football bowl game played between Drake Bulldogs and Arizona Wildcats at Montgomery Stadium in Phoenix, Arizona. The game marked the second bowl game for each school. Drake had previously played in the 1946 Raisin Bowl, while Arizona was featured in the 1921 San Diego E-W Christmas Classic. The game was sponsored by Phoenix Kiwanis Club.

The Wildcats out-gained Drake in total yards 355-206; however, the Bulldogs capitalized from three costly Arizona turnovers during the contest.

Game summary
Drake's Frank Metzger scored on a 1-yard run to give the Bulldogs an early 7–0 lead. The second quarter would see the Bulldogs go up 14–0 thanks to a Floyd Miller 20-yard interception return. An Ed Walgast 15-yard run would cut the lead to 14–7 at half. Late in the third quarter, Charlie Hall returned a punt 79-yards for a touchdown, but the ensuing extra point by one of the nation's top kickers Tackett hit the upright, preserving a 14–13 lead. Neither team would score in the four quarter. With time running out Arizona fumbled at the Drake 11-yard line on a potential game-winning drive, allowing Drake to capture a 14–13 victory.

The victory improved Drake's bowl record to 2–0. Arizona fell to 0–2 in bowl games.

Scoring summary

First Quarter
Drake- Frank Metzger 1 yard touchdown run (Steere kick)

Second Quarter
Drake- Floyd Miller 20-yard interception return (Steere kick)
Arizona- Ed Wolgast 15 yard touchdown run (Tackett kick)

Third Quarter
Arizona- Ed Wolgast 6 yard touchdown run (failed PAT)

Fourth Quarter
None

Statistics

Individual statistics

Rushing
Drake: Baer - 11 carries for 36 yards
Drake: Rooker - 12 carries for 38 yards 
Drake: Tarazewich 3 rushes for 14 yards
Arizona: Wolgast - 22 rushes for 133 yards
Arizona: Carillo 7 rushes for 22 yards
Arizona: Hall 15 rushes for 37 yards
Arizona: Carpenter 6 rushes for 37 yards
Arizona: Hodges 2 rushes for 49 yards

Passing
Drake: Handke 3-of-4 for 30 yards
Arizona: Wolgast 4-of-15 for 31 yards

Receiving
Drake: Bienemann 2 catches for 10 yards
Drake: Bunting 1 catches for 20 yards
Arizona: Petersen - 1 catch for 7 yards
Arizona: Woodburn - 1 catch for 9 yards
Arizona: Ackerman - 1 catch for 11 yards
Arizona: Spillsbury - 1 catch for 4 yards

References

Salad Bowl
Salad Bowl (game)
Arizona Wildcats football bowl games
Drake Bulldogs football bowl games
Salad Bowl
January 1949 sports events in the United States